Panaji (also known as Panjim) is the capital of the Indian state of Goa and the headquarters of North Goa district. Previously, it was the territorial capital of the former Portuguese India. It lies on the banks of the Mandovi river estuary in the Tiswadi sub-district (tehsil). With a population of 114,759 in the metropolitan area, Panaji is Goa's largest urban agglomeration, ahead of Margao and Mormugao.

Panaji has terraced hills, concrete buildings with balconies and red-tiled roofs, churches, and a riverside promenade. There are avenues lined with gulmohar, acacia and other trees. The baroque Our Lady of the Immaculate Conception Church is located overlooking the main square known as Praça da Igreja. Panaji has been selected as one of hundred Indian cities to be developed as a smart city under the Smart Cities Mission.

The city was built with stepped streets and a seven kilometre long promenade on a planned grid system after the Portuguese relocated the capital from Velha Goa in the 17th century. It was elevated from a town to a city on 22 March 1843.

Etymology 
The city was renamed from Panjim in English to Panaji, its present official name in the 1980s. The Portuguese name is Pangim. The city is sometimes written as पणजें in (देवनागरी) कोंकणी or Ponnjé in Romi Konkani. The city had been renamed Nova Goa (Portuguese for "New Goa") when it officially replaced the city of Goa (now Old Goa) as the capital of Portuguese India, though the Viceroy had already moved there in 1759.

The justification of the modern word Panaji is derived from the words panjani and khali, which mean a boat and a small creek respectively, in Sanskrit. Thus the modern word Panjim is believed to be a corruption of the old word Panjanakhani as inscribed on the discovered Panjim copper-plates dated 1059 CE, belonging to the rule of Kadamba king Jayakesi I. According to legend, this northern capital city was mentioned in a stone inscription of Kadamba king Jayakesi I dated 1054 CE as 'Panjanakhani', giving him the epithet of Padavalendra which is Kannada for  lord of the western ocean.

Some historians state that it was named after a Shia Muslim shrine also called a "Panja" on one of the coastal hill tops.

History 
Panaji was made the capital of Portuguese India, after a devastating epidemics decimated the population of the City of Goa in the mid 18th Century.

Panaji was annexed by India with the rest of Goa and the former Portuguese territories after the Indian annexation of Portuguese India in 1961. It became a state-capital on Goa's elevation to statehood in 1987. Between 1961 and 1987, it was the capital of the Union Territory of Goa, Daman and Diu. A new Legislative Assembly complex was inaugurated in March 2000, across the Mandovi River, in Alto Porvorim. Panaji is also the administrative headquarters of North Goa district.

Geography 

Suburbs 
Panaji has various vāde or sub-divisions, including:

 São Tomé, Fontainhas, Mala, Portais, Altinho, Cortin, Praça da Igreja, Tar, Bazar, Japão, and Boça de Vaca.

Some areas outlying it are:

 Campal, Santa Inez, Chinchollem, Batulem, Merces, Bambolim, Caranzalem, Santa Cruz, Siridao, Dona Paula, and Platô de Taleigão.

Besides lying on the banks of the Mandovi River, Panaji is bound by two creeks called pői by the locals, namely Ourém creek and Santa Inêz creek.

Demographics 
During the 2011 census of India, Panaji had a population of 114,405. Males constituted 52% of the population and females 48%. It had an average literacy rate of 90.9%; male literacy was 94.6% and female literacy 86.9%. In Panaji, 9.6% of the population was under 7 years of age.

Religion 
Panaji comprises three major religions, with Hinduism being the majority with 64.08% followers, Christianity with 26.51% followers, and the smallest being Islam with 8.84% followers. 0.4% of the population count as other which include Buddhist, Jain, and Sikh followers.

Climate 
Panaji features a tropical monsoon climate (Köppen climate classification Am). The climate in Panaji is hot in summer and equable in winter.

The monsoon period is from June to October with heavy rainfall and gusty winds.

Landmarks 

The heart of the city is the Praça da Igreja (Church Square) where the Jardim Garcia de Orta (municipal garden) with the Portuguese Baroque Igreja de Nossa Senhora da Imaculada Conceição, originally built in 1541. Other tourist attractions include the old and rebuilt Adilshahi Palace (or Idalção Palace), dating from the sixteenth century, the Institute Menezes Braganza, the Chapel of St. Sebastian and the Fontainhas area—which is considered to be the old Latin Quarter—as well as the nearby beach of Miramar. Panaji hosted the relics of Saint John Bosco (also known as Don Bosco) until 21 August 2011 at the Don Bosco Oratory.

One of the capital city's most discerning assets is the Mahalaxmi Temple. Located on the Dada Vaidya road (Rua de Saudade during the Portuguese times), the Mahalaxmi deity is the chief object of veneration for all Panjimites, irrespective of caste, class, sex or creed.

The carnival celebrations in February include a colourful parade on the streets. This is followed by the Shigmo / Xigmo, or Holi. The Narkāsūr parade on the night before Diwali in the city is very colourful.

Well-known places in Panaji are the 18th June Road (a busy thoroughfare in the heart of the town and a shopping area for tourists and locals), Mala area, Miramar beach and the Kala Academy (a cultural centre known for its structure built by architect Charles Correa). Kala Academy is a place where Goa showcases its art and culture.

Palace of Adil Shah (Secretariat Building) 

Situated on the banks of Mandovi River in the heart of Panaji is ‘Old Secretariat’ building popularly known as ‘Adil Shah's Palace’. It was built by Yusuf Adil Shah of the Bijapur Sultanate in around 1500, as a summer residence and fortress. The building was armed with 55 cannons and surrounded by a moat. The Palace was besieged by Portuguese admiral Afonso de Albuquerque in 1510 and in the mid-1500s the Portuguese conquerors renamed it as ‘Idalcao's Palace’ and was the temporary residence of the first ‘Viceroy of Goa’. In 1963 this ancient structure was renovated by Goa government to house Goa Legislative Assembly. This structure today is 'The Goa State Museum'.

Other attractions 
Salim Ali Bird Sanctuary is a bird sanctuary named after the ornithologist Dr. Salim Ali. The sanctuary, located in the village of Chorão, near Panaji, plays host to rare and endangered bird species—both migratory and resident.

Goa is famous for its beaches, and Miramar, Bambolim, and Dona Paula are three popular beaches located near Panaji.

Dona Paula is the meeting point for two of Goa's famous rivers, Zuari and Mandovi. These two rivers meet at the Arabian Sea. The official residence of the governor of Goa, known as Cabo Raj Bhavan, is situated on the westernmost tip of Dona Paula.

Miramar Beach is one of the more crowded beaches in Goa, which remains full with local and international tourists throughout the year.

Also located near Panaji, is the Goa Science Centre which was opened to the public in December 2001. The Caculo Mall is also located in St. Inez near Panaji. Also Madhuban Complex, at St.inez is very popular among Panjimites.

Goa is known for its casinos as well.

Education 

Goa's only university, the Goa University, is situated at Taleigão on the outskirts of Panaji. Some other educational institutes in Panaji are:

 Goa Medical College, Bambolim
 Goa College of Pharmacy
 Goa Polytechnic Panaji
 Goa College of Fine Arts
 The Rosary High School, Miramar
 Our lady of Rosary (Green Rosary), Dona Paula
 Santa Cruz High School, Santa Cruz
 Don Bosco High School
 Goa Institute of Management
 Dempo College of Commerce and Economics, Altinho
 Dhempe College of Arts and Sciences, Miramar
 Mary Immaculate Girls High School, São Tomé/Fontainhas
Sharada Mandir School,Miramar

Research centres 
The National Institute of Oceanography (CSIR-NIO) is situated at Dona Paula, on the outskirts of Panaji city. It specialises in marine science research.

Transport 

Transport is done mainly by buses.

Media and communications 
State-owned All India Radio has a local station in Panaji which transmits various programs of mass interest. The annual International Film Festival of India (IFFI), is held in Panaji.

Governance 
The Goa government, as well as the Indian government, has its major offices in Goa.
Bombay High Court – Goa bench
Goa Education Development Corporation
Industrial Development Corporation Goa
Junta House – houses government offices
Goa Passport Office.
Press Information Bureau (Government of India's Press Office)
Sports Authority of Goa
All India Radio, Altinho
Doordarshan Complex, Altinho

The hillock called Altinho houses some major central government offices and the residences of prominent officials and politicians.

Panaji is part of Panaji (Goa Assembly constituency) and North Goa (Lok Sabha constituency).

Politics 
The current Chief Minister of Goa, Pramod Sawant, resides here. The Corporation of the City of Panaji (CCP) administers the city and its Mayor is Rohit Monserrate. Vasant Agshikar is the Deputy Mayor.

The current Governor is S. Pillai.

Sports 

Two of Goa's premier association football clubs Dempo S.C. and Sporting Clube de Goa are based in Panaji and they both compete in India's one of the top-tier league I-League. Clube Tennis de Gaspar Dias in Miramar was founded in the year 1926 and remains among the most sought after Tennis clubs in Goa. The multipurpose Campal Indoor Complex is planned in Campal besides the existing football ground. The Don Bosco college football grounds on General Bernardo Guedes road has been long a long established sports field in the city. It also has a football club named FC Goa in Indian Super League.

International relations

Twin towns – Sister cities 
Panaji is twinned with:
 Lisbon, Portugal

See also 
 1961 Indian annexation of Goa
 Tourism in Goa

References

External links 
Goa: A complete Guide
Government of Goa

Cities and towns in North Goa district
North Goa district
Populated coastal places in India
Port cities and towns of the Arabian Sea
Port cities in India
Tourist attractions in North Goa district
Indian capital cities